Huayopata District is one of fourteen districts of the province La Convención in Peru. Huyro, the capital of the district had a population of 1,619 in 2017.  Nearby Amaybamba (not to be confused with the town of the same name in Inkawasi District) had a population of 663. The Peruvian government's estimate of the 2017 population of the district was 4,773 of which 77 percent of the population over 12 years of age belonged to what it defined as the Quechua ethnic group.

Geography 
Huayopata district consists of the narrow valley of the Lucumayo River, the source of which is the north slope of Veronica (mountain), ( in elevation, and the mountains on both sides of the valley.

The Urupampa mountain range traverses the northern border of Hayopata. The highest peak of the district is Urupampa, also called Veronica. Other mountains are listed below:

Climate
The large variation in elevations in Huayopata district results in ecosystems ranging from glaciers and arctic tundra at the highest elevations to tropical rainforest at the lowest elevations.  The capital of Huyro has a climate of Aw (tropical savanna) under the Köppen Classification system. Under the Trewartha climate classification the climate of Huyro is classified as Awbb (tropical savanna, warm year round). Temperatures vary little during the course of the year, although a pronounced dry season occurs from May to September.

Economy
The lower part of the Lucumayo River is one of the nearest and most accessible tropical areas to the heavily populated Sacred Valley and Cusco area of Peru.  Crops grown near Huyro include coffee, cacao (chocolate), coca, tropical fruits, and tea.  Tea was first introduced into Peru as a crop in 1913 near Huyro and is still grown there.

See also 
 Allpamayu
 Inka Tampu
 Luq'umayu
 Quchapata
 Wamanmarka

References